"Cross Road" is the fourth single released by Mr. Children on November 10, 1993.

Overview
The single reached #6 on the Oricon Japanese charts selling 1,255,940 copies during its run on the chart. The title track, "Cross Road", was used to promote the Japanese drama  and also included in Mr. Children's first compilation album, Mr. Children 1992–1995, released on July 11, 2001. The b-side "And I close to you" was included in Mr. Children's third album, Versus, released on September 9, 1993. "Cross Road" has also been covered by other artists including Junko Yamamoto, who covered the song on her cover album "Songs" released on June 6, 2007 and made its live DVD debut for the first time since its release on Mr. Children's "Home" TOUR 2007 ~in the field~ released on August 6, 2008.

Track listing

Personnel 
 Kazutoshi Sakurai – vocals, guitar
 Kenichi Tahara – guitar
 Keisuke Nakagawa – bass
 Hideya Suzuki – drums

Production 
 Producer – Kobayashi Takeshi
 Arrangement - Mr. Children and Takeshi Kobayashi

References 

1993 singles
Mr. Children songs
Japanese television drama theme songs
Songs written by Kazutoshi Sakurai
1993 songs
Toy's Factory singles
Song recordings produced by Takeshi Kobayashi